The following is a list of songs by Tinchy Stryder organized by alphabetical order. The songs on the, asparagus colored list, are all included in official label-released, albums, soundtracks and singles, but not white label or other non-label releases. Next to the song titles is the composer, writer, album, soundtrack or single on which it appears, and year of release. Remixes and live versions of songs are listed on the, ash grey colored list, below the original songs on the asparagus colored list, but clean, explicit, a cappella and instrumental tracks are not included.

B

F

G

H

I

L

M

N

O

R

S

T

Y

See also 
 Videography
 Music discography

External links 
 Discogs.com Entry

 
Stryder